Brewing began in Sri Lanka in 1881 primarily to meet the needs of the colonial tea planters. Despite the country's tropical weather, the preferred beer styles have remained relatively unchanged, with strong stouts remaining popular.

In 2011, Sri Lanka's beer market was estimated to be around 51 million litres per annum, with per capita beer consumption at around 2.7 litres. An increase from 50 million litres and 2.45 litres in 2009. The beer market only represents 39% of the total legitimate alcohol market, the market share however is growing compared to the hard liquor segment. In 2011, the beer industry grew by 23 per cent in volume against 10 per cent growth in the hard liquor segment. Out of the beer consumed in Sri Lanka, 90% is manufactured locally with the remainder imported from Asian markets such as Vietnam, Singapore and India. The local beer market is currently occupied by two main brewers.

The largest of Sri Lanka's brewers is the Lion Brewery, which is also the oldest brewery in the country. It produces over 80% of Sri Lanka's beers. In 1988 it constructed a new brewery at Biyagama to replace the century-old facility at Nuwara Eliya. In 1993 the brewery became a subsidiary of Carson Cumberbatch & Co Ltd, and in 1996 the Carlsberg Group acquired a 25% share of the company. The brewery's portfolio includes lagers, strong beers and stouts, notably Lion, Lion Strong and Lion Stout. The company also brews Carlsberg under licence. The brewery exports its beers to the U.S., Europe, Japan, Australia and the Maldives. Since 2015, the brewery has produced a number of beers that were previously made by Millers Brewery Ltd, which existed from 1962 to 2015.

Sri Lanka's second largest brewer is Heineken Lanka. It started as United Breweries Lanka in 1997, and was later acquired by Asia Pacific Brewery (Lanka) Limited (the former name of Heineken Lanka) in 2005. The brewery's parent company, Heineken Asia Pacific (formerly known as Asia Pacific Breweries), is a Singaporean-based joint venture between Heineken International and Fraser and Neave. The brewery, located in Mawathagama,  produces a range of medium and high-strength beers, including Bison Gold Blend, Tiger Lager, Tiger Black, Anchor Smooth and Anchor Strong.

See also

 Beer in Asia
 Beer and Breweries in Sri Lanka

References